Eamon O'Carroll (born 13 June 1987) is a former Ireland international rugby league footballer who last played for the Widnes Vikings. Eamon progressed through the Wigan Warriors Academy after signing in 2002 from Waterhead A.R.L.F.C. (in Waterhead, Greater Manchester) to eventually find himself playing  during the 2005 and 2006 seasons.

He was called up into the first-team squad for the first time before Wigan Warriors' Challenge Cup match with Wakefield Trinity Wildcats in April 2006. He was an immediate hit with the Wigan Warriors fans for his enthusiasm and work rate. He went on to make four more appearances that season.

After numerous impressive performances Eamon O'Carroll went on to make 13 Super League appearances for Wigan Warriors in the 2007 season which was probably best remembered for the opening day of the season when Wigan Warriors played Warrington Wolves where Adrian Morley came off second best in a collision with Eamon.

In 2008 Eamon O'Carroll really started making a name for himself as a tough, stocky  who could really stand his ground with the big lads. Many fans were at first sceptical about the success O'Carroll would have in the Super League due to his size. However Eamon proved his critics wrong with numerous impressive performances making 21 appearances and scoring two tries. He was rewarded with a three-year contract.

He is an Ireland international.

He was named in the Ireland training squad for the 2008 Rugby League World Cup. He made numerous impressive performances for Ireland in the 2008 Rugby League World Cup where he stood up well to some of the best players in the world.

He started the 2009 season as a substitute in a home defeat by Wakefield Trinity Wildcats. Despite being on the losing side, O'Carroll earned himself a starting spot for the next three weeks in favour of the out of form Andy Coley. He then made 2 more appearances for Wigan Warriors before he was ruled out for the season with a broken bone in his foot.

In September 2011, O'Carroll signed a 3-year contract with Hull F.C. for 2012.

In June 2012, O'Carroll signed a contract with Widnes Vikings till end of 2014 season.

In April 2014, Eamon signed a new two-year deal to stay with Widnes Vikings,.

References

External links

(archived by web.archive.org) Wigan Warriors profile
 Eamon O'Carroll Wigan Career Page on the Wigan RL Fansite.
(archived by web.archive.org) Ireland profile

1987 births
Living people
English rugby league players
English people of Irish descent
Newcastle Thunder coaches
Ireland national rugby league team players
Rugby league players from Oldham
Rugby league props
Widnes Vikings players
Wigan Warriors players